The Catholic Bishops' Conference of Kazakhstan was the episcopal conference of Kazakhstan, that operated from 2003 until 2022. It consisted of Archdiocese, two dioceses, and apostolic administration.

History 
On 7 July 1999, Pope John Paul II establishes a new administrative division of the territory of the Republic of Kazakhstan. Thus, a diocese was formed in Karaganda, which was directly subordinate to the Vatican, and three Apostolic Administrations in Astana, Almaty, and Atyrau. On 17 May 2003, the Apostolic Administration in Astana was elevated to the Archdiocese and the Apostolic Administration in Almaty was elevated to the rank of a diocese. The Conference of Catholic Bishops of the Republic of Kazakhstan was established in 2003. The plenary sessions of the Conference are held twice a year. One of the bishops is elected chairman of the conference for a three-year term, who can hold this office for no more than two consecutive terms.

On 8 September 2021 was established the new governing body – the Bishops' Conference of Central Asia by the Congregation for the Evangelization of Peoples, and this Conference become as a part of this new creation. It ceased to operate in April 2022, when the new Conference began to work.

Structure of the Conference 

 Structure of the Conference of Catholic Bishops of the Republic of Kazakhstan

Chairman of the KCEC:  Bishop Jose Luis Mumbiela Sierra

Secretary General: Bishop Athanasius Schneider

 Conference composition:

Archbishop Tomasz Peta

Bishop Jose Luis Mumbiela Sierra

Bishop Adelio Del Oro

Bishop Athanasius Schneider

Priest Peter Sakmar

Press Secretary: Fr. Petr Pytlovani

Dioceses and Bishops 
Archdiocese of St. Mary in Astana

 Archbishop Tomasz Peta
 Bishop Athanasius Schneider, Auxiliary Bishop

Diocese of the Holy Trinity in Almaty

 Bishop Jose Luis Mumbiela Sierra

Diocese of Karaganda

 Bishop Adelio Del Oro

Atyrau Apostolic Administration

 Priest Peter Sakmar

See also 

 Christianity in Kazakhstan
 Catholic Church in Kazakhstan
 Apostolic Administration of Kazakhstan and Central Asia

References

External links 

 Official website

Kazakhstan
Kazakhstan
Bishops' Conference
Kazakhstan